One Good Reason is the third solo studio album by the English singer-songwriter Paul Carrack, then a member of the rock supergroup Mike + The Mechanics. It was released in November 1987 by Chrysalis Records, five years after his previous studio album, Suburban Voodoo (1982). In the interim between solo albums, Carrack had been a member of Nick Lowe and his Cowboy Outfit, which released two studio albums in 1984 and 1985, and joined Mike + The Mechanics for their 1985 self-titled debut.

Mike + The Mechanics drummer Peter Van Hooke and songwriter and record producer Christopher Neil also appear on the album, serving in the same roles they did for the Mechanics. The album includes two of Carrack's highest charting solo hits in the US, "Don't Shed a Tear" (which became a Top 10 hit, peaking at No. 9) and "One Good Reason" (which peaked at No. 28).

In addition to "Don't Shed a Tear", three additional singles charted from the album, including a cover of the Jackie DeShannon classic, "When You Walk in the Room". The album's title track, another one of these singles, also cracked the Top 30 on the US chart.

Critical reception

Jim Green of Trouser Press was not entirely enthusiastic about the album, writing: "Half of One Good Reason is decent-to-good, and the rest is mediocre-to-poor....it's got more radio-music slickness than Carrack's had in years but at the cost of some identity."  Green notes that "It did yield a genuine not-bad pop hit ("Don't Shed a Tear")."

AllMusic's Mike DeGagne retrospectively calls "Don't Shed a Tear" "the album's highlight, bolstered by its subtle, laid-back groove with a stop and start tempo which comes across as unique to a certain extent." But he castigated the rest of the record, saying that "while the songs are well-written lyrically, they're dispensed rather half-heartedly from a musical standpoint" and "It's apparent in tracks like 'Fire With Fire' and 'Give Me a Chance' that Paul Carrack has reached the point of pop pedestrianism."

Track listing

Personnel
Credits are adapted from the album's liner notes.

Musicians
 Paul Carrack – lead vocals
 Paul "Wix" Wickens – keyboards
 Tim Renwick – guitars
 Peter Van Hooke – drums
 Frank Ricotti – percussion
 John "Irish" Earle – saxophone (7)
 Jackie Rawe – backing vocals
 Linda Taylor – duet vocals (2)

Production and artwork
 Christopher Neil – producer
 Simon Hurrell – engineer
 Pete Woodroffe – engineer
 Peter Corriston – art direction
 Mark Cozza – design
 Brian Griffin – photography
 Recorded at Comforts Place (Lingfield, Surrey, UK).
 Mixed at The Farm (Surrey, UK).

References

External links
 

1987 albums
Chrysalis Records albums
Albums produced by Christopher Neil
Paul Carrack albums